The Loral GZ-22 (also known as the Goodyear GZ-22) was a class of non-rigid airship, or blimp  first flown in 1989 and operated by Goodyear as its flagship promotional aircraft, with  civil registration N4A and christened Spirit of Akron. This was the only airship of this class ever built.
Goodyear originally  designed the GZ-22 to demonstrate the possible renewed use of airships to the United States  Navy, which had ended their  airship operations in 1962. The GZ-22 was designed by Goodyear, but built by Loral after Goodyear sold its aerospace division to Loral in 1987. The GZ-22 had a steel-framed, composite-skinned gondola under a neoprene-impregnated polyester 2-ply envelope, inflated with helium.  At its launch in 1987, the 205-foot 6-inch long Spirit of Akron  was the longest airship in service at that time. The GZ-22 Type Certificate was issued on 31 August 1989.

On 28 October 1999, the Spirit of Akron suddenly entered an uncontrolled left turn and began descending over Suffield Township, Ohio,  crashing into trees and sustaining severe damage. The pilot and technician on board received minor injuries.  The NTSB report on the crash identified improperly hardened metal splines on the control actuators had sheared, causing loss of control and identified the probable cause as being failure by the "flight control system manufacturer to meet design (hardness) specifications".

The gondola of the Spirit of Akron is on display at the MAPS Air Museum.

Specifications

References

Notes

Bibliography

1980s United States special-purpose aircraft
Airships of the United States
Goodyear aircraft